William Cobbold (1560–1639) was an English composer. He was lay clerk and organist at the Chapel Royal. One of his most-well known works today is the consort song "New Fashions".

Selected works
"For Death of Her" - an elegy composed upon the 1588 death of Mrs. Mary Gascoigne.
"New Fashions" - recorded by Theatre of Voices & Fretwork, Paul Hillier
"With wreaths of rose and laurel" - Cobbold's contribution to The Triumphs of Oriana collection of 25 madrigals from 23 different composers published in 1601 by Thomas Morley.
"Ye mortal wights"

References

1560 births
1639 deaths